Internalization (or internalisation) is the process of making something internal, with more specific meanings in various fields. It is the opposite of externalization.

Psychology and sociology 

In psychology, internalization is the outcome of a conscious mind reasoning about a specific subject; the subject is internalized, and the consideration of the subject is internal. Internalization of ideals might take place following religious conversion, or in the process of, more generally, moral conversion. Internalization is directly associated with learning within an organism (or business) and recalling what has been learned.

In psychology and sociology, internalization involves the integration of attitudes, values, standards and the opinions of others into one's own identity or sense of self. In psychoanalytic theory, internalization is a process involving the formation of the super ego. Many theorists believe that the internalized values of behavior implemented during early socialization are key factors in predicting a child's future moral character. The self-determination theory proposes a motivational continuum from the extrinsic to intrinsic motivation and autonomous self-regulation. Some research suggests a child's moral self starts to develop around age three. These early years of socialization may be the underpinnings of moral development in later childhood. Proponents of this theory suggest that children whose view of self is "good and moral" tend to have a developmental trajectory toward pro-social behavior and few signs of anti-social behavior.

In one child developmental study, researchers examined two key dimensions of early conscience – internalization of rules of conduct and empathic affects to others – as factors that may predict future social, adaptive and competent behavior. Data was collected from a longitudinal study of children, from two parent families, at age 25, 38, 52, 67 and 80 months. Children's internalization of each parent's rules and empathy toward each parent's simulated distress were observed at 25, 38 and 52 months.  Parents and teachers rated their adaptive, competent, pro-social behavior and anti-social behavior at 80 months. The researchers found that first, both the history of the child's early internalization of parental rules and the history of their empathy predicted the children's competent and adaptive functioning at 80 months, as rated by parents and teachers. Second, children with stronger histories of internalization of parental rules from 25 to 52 months perceived themselves as more moral at 67 months. Third, the children that showed stronger internalization from 25 to 52 months came to see themselves as more moral and "good". These self-perceptions, in turn, predicted the way parents and teachers would rate their competent and adaptive functioning at 80 months.

As a symptom

In behavioral psychology, the concept of internalization may also refer to disorders and behaviors in which a person deals with stressors in manners not externally evident.  Such disorders and behaviors include depression, anxiety disorder, bulimia and anorexia.

Biology 
In sciences such as biology, internalization is another term for endocytosis, in which molecules such as proteins are engulfed by the cell membrane and drawn into the cell.

Economics and management 
In economics, internalization theory explains the practice of multinational enterprises (MNEs) to execute transactions within their organization rather than relying on an outside market. It must be cheaper for an MNE to internalize the transfer of its unique ownership advantages between countries than to do so through markets. In other words, the alternative to internalization through direct investment is some form of licensing of the firm's know-how to a firm in the target economy.

Finance 
In finance, internalization can refer to several concepts. "When you place an order to buy or sell a stock, your broker has choices on where to execute your order. Instead of routing your order to a market or market-makers for execution, your broker may fill the order from the firm's own inventory – this is called 'internalization'. In this way, your broker's firm may make money on the "spread" – which is the difference between the purchase price and the sale price."  For a related issue regarding trade execution, see payment for order flow.

See also
 Cultural homogenization
 Social influence

Notes

References
Meissner, W. W. (1981), Internalization in Psychoanalysis, International Universities Press, New York.
Wallis, K. C. and J. L. Poulton (2001), Internalization: The Origins and Construction of Internal Reality, Open University Press, Buckingham and Philadelphia.
Oxford Open Learning GCSE Psychology - Module three: lesson nine.

Social philosophy
Sociological terminology